The Trianon Treaty Day is a public holiday in Romania celebrated every 4 June to commemorate the signing of the Treaty of Trianon in 1920. The holiday was first proposed in 2015 by the Romanian politician Titus Corlățean and subsequently promulgated on 18 November 2020 by President Klaus Iohannis.

According to the law that promulgated the holiday, on Trianon Treaty Day, cultural, educational, and scientific events of both local and national level can be held to raise awareness of the treaty and its significance and importance. Civilians, as well as organizations and local or central authorities can support such events through material and logistical support. The Romanian Television and Romanian Radio Broadcasting Company are permitted to broadcast programs related to the observance. In 2022, on the occasion of the Trianon Treaty Day, Giuseppe Nicolini's opera  had its debut in Romania at the Romanian National Opera, Cluj-Napoca.

The holiday has elicited negative responses from the Hungarian community of Romania and Hungary itself. It has been claimed that the Romanian decision for promulgating the holiday was because of the earlier establishment of 4 June in Hungary as the "Day of National Unity" and to endorse anti-Hungarian sentiments. On the other hand, Corlățean, who proposed the law passed by the Parliament of Romania, declared to the BBC: "I do not understand why the Romanians should be shy of marking what was fundamental for their history, because we don't want to offend anyone".

After the collapse of Austria-Hungary at the end of World War I, the Romanian Army took control of Transylvania starting from November 1918 as the Hungarian–Romanian War was ongoing. During this period, the region declared unification with Romania on 1 December 1918. The Treaty of Trianon was a treaty signed on 4 June 1920 between Hungary and the Allies (including Romania). As a result, Transylvania, as well as parts of Banat, Crișana, and Maramureș, were officially recognized as part of Romania. Hungary also lost territories to Austria, Czechoslovakia, the Kingdom of Serbs, Croats and Slovenes and Poland as a consequence of it.

See also
 Public holidays in Romania
 Hungary–Romania relations

References

Annual events in Romania
Spring (season) events in Romania
Observances in Romania
June observances
Public holidays in Romania
2020 establishments in Romania
Hungary–Romania relations
Great Union (Romania)